Daniel Oswaldo Briceño Bueno (born September 16, 1985) is a Colombian footballer. He currently plays for La Equidad, as a central defender and as a striker.

Briceño began his professional playing career in 2005 with Deportes Tolima, and was a member of the 2005 Colombian Sub-20.

Honors
Champion with the Colombian Selection Sub-20 in the Central American Games and of the Caribbean
Runner-up with the Tolima Sports in the Mustang II Cup of 2006

External links
 

1985 births
Living people
Colombian footballers
Categoría Primera A players
Deportivo Cali footballers
Atlético Junior footballers
Deportes Tolima footballers
La Equidad footballers
Deportivo Pasto footballers
Real Cartagena footballers
Colombian expatriate footballers
Expatriate footballers in Venezuela
Association football forwards
Association football central defenders